Mario Bò (born 4 December 1912 in Savona; died 4 December 2003 in Turin) was an Italian professional football player.

Honours
 Coppa Italia winner: 1935/36.

1912 births
2003 deaths
Italian footballers
Serie A players
Torino F.C. players
Juventus F.C. players
Genoa C.F.C. players
Inter Milan players
Association football midfielders